Wind power in Kenya contributes only a small amount of the country's electrical power. However, its share in energy production is increasing. Kenya aims to generate 2,036 MW of wind power, or 9% of the country's total capacity, by 2030.

Kenya has two major wind farms, Ngong Hills Wind Farm, located in Ngong, Kajiado County. It produces around 25 MW of electricity. It is owned by  Kenya Electricity Generating Company (KenGen) and cost KSh.1.6 billion/= (US$18 million) to construct. The other is Lake Turkana Wind Power Station located in Marsabit County. It generates 310.25 MW of electricity.

Notable projects

Lake Turkana Wind Power
Kenya built the largest wind farm in Africa, the Lake Turkana Wind Power consortium (LTWP). It provides 300 MW of low-cost electrical power. With a projected cost of KSh.70 billion/= (US$800 million), it would be the largest single private investment in Kenya's history. This wind farm would allow Kenya to eliminate its thermal generating plants, saving KSh.15.6 billion/= (US$180 million) per year on imported fuel. The project would stimulate the Kenyan economy by contributing KSh.3 billion/= (US$35 million) every year in tax revenue, a total of KSh.58.6 billion/= (US$673 million) over the life of the project.

According to a case study from the Low Emission Development Strategies Global Partnership (LEDS GP),  the Lake Turkana Wind Power Project will increase the national electricity supply while creating jobs and reducing greenhouse gas emissions. 310 MW of wind energy capacity will:
mitigate greenhouse gas emissions equal to 740,000 metric tons of carbon dioxide equivalent (tCO2eq) annually
increase national electricity supply by 15–20% (relative to 2015 generating capacity)
enhance reliability of energy supply
stabilise energy prices
create more than 2,000 local jobs including 150 permanent jobs
mitigate human health impacts from harmful air pollutants
 improve access to food, health facilities, and water through corporate social responsibility programs
increase income generating opportunities
improve local education

Wind power facilities in Kenya

 Source: KenGen

See also

 Energy in Kenya
 Geothermal power in Kenya
 Hydroelectric power in Kenya
 List of power stations in Kenya
 Renewable energy in Kenya
 Renewable energy by country

References

External links
 KenGen
 Lake Turkana Wind Power
 Ministry of Energy and Petroleum (Kenya)
 Energy Regulation Commission (Kenya)
 Kenya Power

 
Kenya